Merika is a 1984 drama film directed by Gil Portes and starring Nora Aunor and Bembol Roco.  Aunor portrayed the role Mila, an Overseas Filipino Worker (OFW) who works as a nurse in America.

Cast
Nora Aunor as Milagros "Mila" Cruz
Bembol Roco as Mon Zablan
Cesar Aliparo as Lolo Caloy

Awards and recognition

References

External links 
 

1984 films
Filipino-language films
Philippine drama films
1984 drama films
Films set in the United States
Films directed by Gil Portes